Marek Zagrapan (born 6 December 1986) is a Slovak professional ice hockey centre currently playing for Diables Rouges de Briançon of the Ligue Magnus.

He was drafted by the National Hockey League (NHL)'s Buffalo Sabres in the first round, 13th overall, at the 2005 NHL Entry Draft.

Playing career
Zagrapan was drafted by the Buffalo Sabres in the first round, 13th overall, in the 2005 NHL Entry Draft. After playing two seasons in the Czech Extraliga with HC Zlín, Zagrapan came to North America after HC Zlín became Czech champions in 2004. He then played two seasons in the Quebec Major Junior Hockey League (QMJHL) with the Chicoutimi Saguenéens.

On 12 September 2006, Zagrapan signed an entry-level contract with Buffalo and spent the 2006–07 and 2007–08 seasons with their American Hockey League (AHL) affiliate, the Rochester Americans. Zagrapan then spent the 2008–09 season with the new affiliate of the Sabres, the Portland Pirates.

On 29 May 2009, Zagrapan returned to Europe to play professionally, citing a lack of opportunity with the Sabres due to his low scoring output; he signed with Severstal Cherepovets of the Kontinental Hockey League (KHL) on a three-year contract.

In the 2014–15 season, Zagrapan joined Austrian club Graz 99ers of the Austrian Hockey League (EBEL) on an initial try-out contract on 20 September 2014. Zagrapan impressed with Graz to earn a one-year contract for the remainder of the campaign. In 51 games with the club, he produced 9 goals and 30 points.

On 13 July 2015, Zagrapan left Graz as a free agent for League rivals Dornbirner EC.

Career statistics

Regular season and playoffs

International

References

External links

1986 births
Buffalo Sabres draft picks
Chicoutimi Saguenéens (QMJHL) players
Dornbirn Bulldogs players
Slovak expatriate ice hockey players in Russia
Graz 99ers players
HPK players
Kiekko-Vantaa players
Rytíři Kladno players
HC Kometa Brno players
HC Košice players
Living people
National Hockey League first-round draft picks
HC Oceláři Třinec players
Portland Pirates players
Sportspeople from Prešov
Rochester Americans players
Severstal Cherepovets players
HK Poprad players
HC 21 Prešov players
Slovak ice hockey centres
Slovak expatriate sportspeople in France
PSG Berani Zlín players
HC Yugra players
Diables Rouges de Briançon players
Expatriate ice hockey players in France
Slovak expatriate ice hockey players in Canada
Slovak expatriate ice hockey players in the United States
Slovak expatriate ice hockey players in the Czech Republic
Slovak expatriate ice hockey players in Finland
Slovak expatriate ice hockey players in Switzerland
Slovak expatriate sportspeople in Austria
Expatriate ice hockey players in Austria